Junior is the debut album led by jazz pianist Junior Mance which was recorded in 1959 and released on the Verve label. Norman Granz offered Mance the opportunity to record his own album after working on the sessions that produced Dizzy Gillespie's Have Trumpet, Will Excite!.

Reception

The Allmusic site awarded the album 3 stars.

Track listing
All compositions by Junior Mance except where noted.
 "A Smooth One" (Benny Goodman, Ernie Royal) – 3:29
 "Miss Jackie's Delight" (Gene Wright) - 3:54
 "Whisper Not" (Benny Golson) - 4:22
 "Love for Sale" (Cole Porter) - 4:26
 "Lilacs in the Rain" (Peter DeRose, Mitchell Parish) - 3:42
 "Small Fry" (Hoagy Carmichael, Frank Loesser) - 4:08
 "Jubilation" - 3:31
 "Birks' Works" (Dizzy Gillespie) - 5:45
 "Blues for Beverlee" - 7:54
 "Junior's Tune" - 3:33

Personnel
Junior Mance - piano
Ray Brown - bass
Lex Humphries - drums

References

 

1959 debut albums
Instrumental albums
Junior Mance albums
Verve Records albums
Albums produced by Norman Granz